Frederick George Fooks (26 November 1880 – 30 June 1958) was an Australian rules footballer who played with Essendon in the Victorian Football League (VFL).

Notes

External links 

1880 births
1958 deaths
Australian rules footballers from Victoria (Australia)
Essendon Football Club players